Labdia dolomella is a moth in the family Cosmopterigidae. It was described by John David Bradley in 1961. It is known from the Rennell Island in the Solomon Islands.

References

External links
Arctiidae genus list at Butterflies and Moths of the World of the Natural History Museum

Labdia
Moths described in 1961